Jeremy Michael Riddle (born October 18, 1977) is an American Christian musician, songwriter, and worship leader, best known for a long tenure as an ensemble leader with Bethel Music.

Background 

Born in Mount Holly Township, New Jersey Jeremy Riddle's debut album, Full Attention, was released on March 6, 2007. It peaked on the Billboard Top Christian and Gospel Albums Chart at No. 47, and the only single released from the album, "Sweetly Broken", peaked at No. 19 on both the Billboard Hot Christian Songs and Christian Airplay Charts. It has also been used as a contemporary worship song.

In 2009, Riddle released The Now and Not Yet through Varietal Records. Riddle has stated on his website that the reason for this album is to "[create] fresh expressions of worship that both exalt the Creator and encourage and enlighten the people of God." The album has appeared on two charts, Billboards Hot Christian Albums format (peaking at No. 15) and the Top Heatseekers (peaking at No. 11).

The first single off the new album is "Bless His Name", written by Riddle's friend Tony Sanchez. The song charted on Billboards Hot Christian Songs format, peaking at No. 36.

Riddle released albums Prepare The Way: Live in 2010 and Furious in 2011.

From September 2011 to June of 2019, Riddle was the worship community pastor at Bethel Church in Redding, California, where he frequently led worship. He appeared on many albums by Bethel Music. Some of the songs from Bethel music included "This is Amazing Grace" and "In Your Light" from the album For the Sake of the World. "This is Amazing Grace" song was written by Phil Wickham, Josh Farro and Riddle, and produced by Pete Kipley. Billboard named it No. 1 on the Christian Airplay Songs chart for 2014.

In 2019 Riddle announced that he and his wife felt the Lord leading them back to Southern California. They are now at Vineyard Anaheim as the Worship, Creativity and Prayer Pastors.

Discography

with Recon Records

 Beautiful Jesus (2003)

with Vineyard

Full Attention (2007)
The Now and Not Yet (2009)
Prepare the Way: Live (2010)
Furious (2011)

with Bethel Music

Be Lifted High (2011) (by Bethel Music)
The Loft Sessions (2012) (by Bethel Music)
For the Sake of the World (2012) (by Bethel Music)
Tides (2013) (by Bethel Music)
Tides Live (2014) (by Bethel Music)
Have It All (2016) (by Bethel Music)
Starlight (2017) (by Bethel Music)
More (2017) (by Bethel Music)
Moments: Mighty Sound (2018) (by Bethel Music)

Independent

Joy to the World - EP (2018) (Jeremy Riddle/Watershed Music Group)
Holy Ground: Live Around The World (2020) (Watershed Music Group)
Live In The Prayer Room (2022)

References

External links
 
 Jeremy Riddle's profile on Bethel Music
 Jeremy Riddle's profile on Watershed Music Group

1977 births
Living people
Association of Vineyard Churches
20th-century Christians
21st-century Christians
21st-century American singers
American Charismatics
American male singer-songwriters
American performers of Christian music
Composers of Christian music
Christian music songwriters
People from Mount Holly, New Jersey
Performers of contemporary worship music
Singer-songwriters from New Jersey
California State University, Fullerton alumni
21st-century American male singers